"Touch Me in the Morning" is a 1973 song recorded by Diana Ross.

Touch Me in the Morning may also refer to:

 Touch Me in the Morning (album), a 1973 album by Diana Ross
 Touch Me in the Morning (film), a 1999 American film by Giuseppe Andrews